Carl Elmberg (16 September 1889 – 1 December 1955) was a Swedish sculptor. His work was part of the sculpture event in the art competition at the 1932 Summer Olympics.

References

1889 births
1955 deaths
20th-century Swedish sculptors
Swedish male sculptors
Olympic competitors in art competitions
People from Kalmar